The Ryazan Power Station (also called Novomichurinsk Power Station) is the fifth largest power station in Russia, with an installed capacity of 3,130 MW. The power station is located in Novomichurinsk of the Ryazan Oblast, Russia. Construction began in 1968 with the first unit going online in 1973. It mainly fires lignite from Moscow and Kansk-Achinsk coal basins.

A second concrete chimney is only slightly lower, and two more chimneys  in height are made from steel. Power is generated by four units of 300 MW, two units of 800 MW. Seventh unit (420 MW) is former GRES-24, situated nearby and joined into Ryazan Power Station in 2008. GRES-24 initially was built as first in the world power plant with magnetohydrodynamic generator, but in 1989 this project was cancelled and the plant was finished using traditional construction.

See also 

 List of largest power stations in the world
 List of power stations in Russia

References

External links 
 

Oil-fired power stations in Russia
Power stations built in the Soviet Union
Chimneys in Russia